Douglas Jones (8 September 1914 – 1997) was a Welsh footballer who played in the English Football League for Carlisle United and Stoke City.

Career
Jones began his career with his home town club Blaenau Ffestiniog before joining Everton. He failed to make the breakthrough at Goodison Park and left for Colwyn Bay before joining Stoke City in 1938. He played one match for Stoke which came on the final day of the 1938–39 season in a 0–0 at Leeds United he then signed for Carlisle United but his career was halted due to World War II. He returned to play for Stoke during the war and played two seasons for the "Cumbrians" once the war was over. After a short spell with Rochdale he played for non-league Northwich Victoria.

Career statistics
Source:

References

Welsh footballers
Stoke City F.C. players
Everton F.C. players
Carlisle United F.C. players
Rochdale A.F.C. players
Northwich Victoria F.C. players
English Football League players
1914 births
1997 deaths
People from Blaenau Ffestiniog
Sportspeople from Gwynedd
Association football goalkeepers
Blaenau Ffestiniog Amateur F.C. players